is a passenger railway station located in Tsurumi-ku, Yokohama, Kanagawa Prefecture, Japan, operated by the private railway company Keikyū.

Lines
Tsurumi-Ichiba Station is served by the Keikyū Main Line and is located 13.8 kilometers from the terminus of the line at Shinagawa  Station in Tokyo.

Station layout
The station consists of two ground-level opposed side platforms connected by an elevated station building built over the platforms and tracks.

Station layout

History
It was renamed to its present name in April 1927. A new station building was completed in April 1984, at which time the platforms were lengthened to accommodate 8-car trains.

Keikyū introduced station numbering to its stations on 21 October 2010; Tsurumi-Ichiba Station was assigned station number KK28.

Passenger statistics
In fiscal 2019, the station was used by an average of 21,572 passengers daily. 

The passenger figures for previous years are as shown below.

Surrounding area
 Japan National Route 25
 old Tōkaidō highway
 Tsurumi River

See also
 List of railway stations in Japan

References

External links

 

Railway stations in Kanagawa Prefecture
Railway stations in Japan opened in 1905
Keikyū Main Line
Railway stations in Yokohama